Stoney Middleton is a civil parish in the Derbyshire Dales district of Derbyshire, England. The parish contains 19 listed buildings that are recorded in the National Heritage List for England.  Of these, one is listed at Grade II*, the middle of the three grades, and the others are at Grade II, the lowest grade.  The parish contains the village of Stoney Middleton and the surrounding countryside.  The listed buildings consist of houses, farmhouses, cottages and associated structures, a church and a tomb in the churchyard, a former malthouse, a bath house, a limekiln, a chapel, a milestone, a former toll house and a village cross.


Key

Buildings

References

Citations

Sources

 

Lists of listed buildings in Derbyshire